Interstate 65 (I-65) meanders across  of the Alabama countryside linking six of the state's 10 largest cities. The highway links together many important roadways that make commerce inside and outside of the state's boundaries possible. It starts at I-10 near Mobile. The route passes through the major cities of Montgomery, Birmingham, and Decatur before entering Tennessee in the north near the town of Ardmore, Alabama.

The entire Alabama portion of I-65 is dedicated as Heroes Highway in honor of Central Intelligence Agency officer Johnny Micheal Spann and all of the people who died during the September 11 attacks.

Route description

I-65 starts its northward journey in Mobile as a three-lane freeway at a directional Y interchange with I-10 not far from the Gulf of Mexico. From there, it runs northeast, intersecting with I-165 in Prichard. At exit 13 in Saraland, the Interstate transitions from three to two lanes. The highway next crosses the Mobile–Tensaw River Delta at the General W.K. Wilson Jr. Bridge. En route to Montgomery, it passes county seats Evergreen (Conecuh County) and Greenville (Butler County). In the case of a hurricane evacuation on Alabama's coast, I-65 can be converted to an evacuation route where all lanes flow in the northbound direction from Mobile to Montgomery. This process is known as contraflow. The terrain on this stretch of road is slightly hilly, aside from a stretch in southern Conecuh County near Castleberry, where the road is slightly mountainous as it descends over  into the southern plains of Alabama.

As the I-65 approaches the Montgomery city limits, the Hyundai Motor Company's automotive plant can be found just off freeway. It can be accessed using the Pintlala–Hope Hull exit (exit 164). After entering the city limits, I-65 intersects U.S. Route 80 (US 80, exit 167; which leads to Selma toward the west) where the Interstate gains an additional lane for a total of three lanes in each direction. Further on, it intersects the southern terminus of I-85 and crosses the Alabama River north of the city. At exit 181, which provide access to Prattville and Wetumpka, I-65's lanes drop to two.

At Chilton County, I-65 enters the Birmingham metropolitan area. Approximately halfway between Montgomery and Birmingham, it passes Clanton, the county seat, where the water tower, visible from the road, is shaped and painted to resemble a huge peach. Between exit 212 (State Route 145 (SR 145)) and exit 219 (County Road 42), I-65 was designated "War on Terror Memorial Highway" in 2014.

I-65 junctions with US 31 (exit 238) in Alabaster, where the Interstate carries three to four lanes until I-20/I-59. I-65 intersects I-459 in Hoover, then passes through the cities of Vestavia Hills and Homewood, which often generate heavy traffic. As the Interstate passes by downtown Birmingham, southbound travelers have a view of the Vulcan statue atop Red Mountain. At the north edge of downtown, I-65 reaches the I-20/I-59 intersection (exit 261) with a crossover interchange, often called "Malfunction Junction", through which the highway has five lanes, continuing on northward with four. 

North of Birmingham at mile 266, interchange ramps provide access to parallel US 31. It is here that I-65 meets the eastern terminus of I-22, which heads northwest to Memphis, Tennessee, filling in a gap in the Interstate Highway System. After which, I-65 intersects Walker Chapel Road (exit 267) in Fultondale, where the Interstate drops to three lanes. The Interstate then continues  in the general direction of Huntsville, crossing the Blount–Cullman county line (milemarker 291), where lanes transition from three to two, as well as passing the city of Cullman on the way. After entering the Decatur metropolitan area, in southern Morgan County, the Interstate passes Decatur. The highway connects the Huntsville–Decatur metropolitan area as it crosses Wheeler Lake (Tennessee River) on a  bridge. The Interstate emerges again into the fringes of Decatur in an open area of seemingly "endless" cotton fields where it intersects, inside Decatur, with SR 20, U.S. Route 72 Alternate (US 72 Alt.), and the spur route I-565 to Huntsville.

Between Walkers Chapel Road in Fultondale and the Tennessee River in Decatur (Limestone County), I-65 has been designated the "Ronald Reagan Memorial Highway". The sign designating the north end of this portion of road cites Reagan's speech in Decatur on July 4, 1984. The Interstate then continues, passing Athens, and merges with US 31.

In the Birmingham–Hoover vicinity, a plan to widen the Interstate from North Birmingham to Alabaster has been proposed. The project is to widen the Interstate by adding an HOV lane and keeping the original three lanes making it four lanes in each direction. This is planned to stretch to the Pelham area. From there, the Interstate will widen from two lanes each way to three lanes each way into the Helena–Alabaster area.

Near the northern border of Alabama with Tennessee on southbound I-65 is located the Alabama Welcome Center and rest area. The unique feature of this rest area compared to others is the large Saturn IB rocket erected on the site as a memorial to Alabama's—and, in particular, Huntsville's—contribution to NASA's space exploration.

History
The first section designed for the future Interstate Highway System spanned from the Tennessee border to Athens at US 31. It opened on November 15, 1958, and has a historical marker on the Tennessee side of the border. It was converted to full Interstate standards around 1970. The first section of Interstate in Alabama opened to traffic was the  stretch of I-65 between northern Jefferson County and Warrior on December 10, 1959. A  segment between Clanton and Calera opened to traffic on March 23, 1961. On April 1, 1961, a  section between north of Warrior and SR 69 near Cullman opened to traffic. On May 25, 1961, two segments of I-65, a  segment near Clanton and a  segment between Calera and Alabaster, were opened. In Mobile, the  section between US 90 and US 45 opened on January 4, 1963. Work on the Tennessee River bridges in Morgan and Limestone counties began in April 1969, and the bridges were dedicated and opened on November 21, 1973.

While most of I-65 in Alabama was completed in the 1960s, the last segments to be completed were some of the last segments to be completed on the entire Interstate Highway System. The  section between Alabaster and Hoover opened on May 20, 1981. The first contacts for the construction of the  segment between US 43 north of Mobile and SR 225 in Baldwin County, including the  General W.K. Wilson Jr. Bridge, were awarded in 1967, and the section was opened on October 2, 1981. At the time, this was the most expensive highway project in the state's history, costing $137 million (equivalent to $ in ). The last section to be completed was a  section between Lewisberg and Warrior that opened on December 19, 1985, which replaced a four-lane section of US 31 that had been designated as part of I-65 but did not meet Interstate Highway standards.

In 1997, at Georgiana (exit 114), honoring legendary country musician and Alabama native Hank Williams, the Interstate was designated as Hank Williams's Memorial "Lost Highway", after one of his songs. This designation continues northward until mile 179 north of Montgomery. From the state's capital, I-65 doglegs northward, bypassing Prattville and Clanton before going through the Birmingham metropolitan area. From exits 242 to 290, this highway carries at least six lanes of traffic. A portion of the Interstate running through Birmingham has been nicknamed "Malfunction Junction" for its numerous wrecks. These accidents include two separate occasions of the support beams melting after crashes by 18-wheelers and the numerous collisions that happen every year, resulting from the junction with I-20 and I-59.

In 2004, following the death of former-President Ronald Reagan, a lengthy segment of I-65 from Jefferson County to Limestone County was designated the Ronald Reagan Memorial Highway. The sign designating the north end of the segment includes a statement from Reagan's speech at Point Mallard Park in nearby Decatur on July 4, 1984.

Future

Just a few miles north of I-22 will be the new interchange (exit 274), which will be Corridor X-1, and has been designated as Interstate 422. This loop route will connect I-65 with I-59 northeast of Birmingham and I-20/I-59 southwest of Birmingham, and this will serve as an Interstate Highway bypass of Birmingham, augmenting the existing I-459, which already provides the southern loop of Birmingham. Construction of this interchange is still several years away, but right-of-way is in the process of being acquired to build I-422.

Exit list

See also

References

External links

 

65
 Alabama
Transportation in Mobile, Alabama
Transportation in Mobile County, Alabama
Transportation in Baldwin County, Alabama
Transportation in Escambia County, Alabama
Transportation in Conecuh County, Alabama
Transportation in Butler County, Alabama
Transportation in Lowndes County, Alabama
Transportation in Montgomery County, Alabama
Transportation in Elmore County, Alabama
Transportation in Autauga County, Alabama
Transportation in Chilton County, Alabama
Transportation in Shelby County, Alabama
Transportation in Jefferson County, Alabama
Transportation in Blount County, Alabama
Transportation in Cullman County, Alabama
Transportation in Morgan County, Alabama
Transportation in Limestone County, Alabama
Highways in Montgomery, Alabama
Transportation in Birmingham, Alabama